The Adam Mickiewicz University (Latin: Universitas Studiorum Mickiewicziana Posnaniensis) is a research university in Poznań, Poland.

It traces its origins to 1611, when under the Royal Charter granted by King Sigismund III Vasa, the Jesuit College became the first university in Poznań. The Poznań Society for the Advancement of Arts and Sciences which played an important role in leading Poznań to its reputation as a chief intellectual centre during the Age of Positivism and partitions of Poland, initiated founding of the university. The inauguration ceremony of the newly founded institution took place on 7 May 1919 that is 308 years after it was formally established by the Polish king and on 400th anniversary of the foundation of the Lubrański Academy which is considered its predecessor. Its original name was Piast University (Polish: Wszechnica Piastowska), which later in 1920 was renamed to University of Poznań (Polish: Uniwersytet Poznański). During World War II staff and students of the university opened an underground Polish University of the Western Lands (Polish: Uniwersytet Ziem Zachodnich). In 1955 University of Poznań adopted a new patron, the 19th-century Polish Romantic poet Adam Mickiewicz, and changed to its current name.

The university is organized into six principal academic units—five research schools consisting of twenty faculties and the doctoral school—with campuses throughout the historic Old Town and Morasko. The university employs roughly 4,000 academics, and has more than 40,000 students who study in some 80 disciplines. More than half of the student body are women. The language of instruction is usually Polish, although several degrees are offered in either German or English. The university library is one of Poland's largest, and houses one of Europe's largest Masonic collections, including the 1723 edition of James Anderson's The Constitutions of the Free-Masons.

The university is currently publishing over 79 research journals, most of them on Pressto publishing platform based on Open Journal System. Adam Mickiewicz University Repository (AMUR) contains over 23704 records of research publications and is one of the first research repositories in Poland.

Due to its history, the university is traditionally considered Poland's most reputable institution of higher learning, this standing equally being reflected in national rankings. Adam Mickiewicz University is a member of the European University Association, EUCEN, SGroup European Universities' Network, Compostela Group of Universities and EPICUR.

History 

From the beginning, the history of the Adam Mickiewicz University has been inextricably linked to the history of Poznań itself and in some measure – the history of the entire Republic of Poland, which, partitioned by the neighboring countries (Prussia, Austria-Hungary and Russia) towards the end of the eighteenth century disappeared from the European map for more than a hundred years. On 28 October 1611, when under the Royal Charter granted by King Sigismund III Vasa, the Jesuit College became the first university in Poznań. These edicts were later affirmed with charters issued by King John II Casimir in 1650, and King John III Sobieski in 1678, the university in Poznań lasted until 1773.  Based on these charters, the university granted scholar degrees to its members.

The inauguration ceremony of the newly founded took place on 7 May 1919, that is 308 years after it was formally established by the Polish king and the 400th anniversary of the foundation of the Lubrański Academy which is considered its spiritual predecessor. Its original name was Piast University (Polish: Wszechnica Piastowska), which later in 1920, was renamed to the University of Poznań (Polish: Uniwersytet Poznański). In 1920, sociologist Florian Znaniecki founded the first Polish department of sociology at the university, one of the first such departments in Europe. In the same period of the university's history, botanist Józef Paczoski founded the world's first institute of phytosociology.

After the invasion of Poland, Poznań was annexed by Germany and the university was closed by the Nazis in 1939. It was reopened as a German university in 1941, which operated until 1944. Staff and students of the Polish university, some of them expelled by Germans to Warsaw, opened an underground Polish University of the Western Lands (Polish: Uniwersytet Ziem Zachodnich), whose classes met in private apartments (see Education in Poland during World War II). Many of the professors and staff were imprisoned and executed in Fort VII in Poznań, including professor Stanisław Pawłowski (rector in the years 1932–33). The Polish university reopened, in much smaller form, after the end of World War II. In 1950, the Medical Faculty, including the Dentistry section and the Faculty of Pharmacy, were split off to form a separate institution, now the Poznań University of Medical Sciences. In 1955, the University of Poznań adopted a new patron, the 19th-century Polish Romantic poet Adam Mickiewicz, and changed to its current name.

Sites 

The university's central administrative building is Collegium Minus, on the west side of Adam Mickiewicz Square at the western end of the street Święty Marcin. (This is one of a group of buildings, including the Imperial Palace, built in the first decade of the 20th century while Poznań was still under German rule; it originally housed a Royal Academy.) Adjoining this is the Aula, which is frequently used for ceremonies and for classical music concerts, and Collegium Iuridicum (accommodating the law faculty). Some teaching takes place in Collegium Maius, another of the aforementioned group of buildings (on ul. Fredry), although this is mainly used by the medical university. Other buildings in the city centre include former communist party headquarters on Święty Marcin, Collegium Novum (used mainly for language teaching) on Al. Niepodległości, and the university library on ul. Ratajczaka.

The university also uses a number of other buildings in southern and western districts of Poznań. However, it is strongly developing its site at Morasko in the north of the city. As of 2006, the faculties of physics, mathematics and computer science, biology, geographical and geological science had moved to the new location. In 2015 they were joined by the faculty of history (Collegium Historicum Novum).

The university also has external branches in other towns of western Poland, including Kalisz, Ostrów Wielkopolski and Słubice. Adam Mickiewicz University maintains close cooperation with Viadrina European University, Germany. The two universities jointly operate the Collegium Polonicum, located just opposite Viadrina on the Polish side of the Oder River.

University owns a seasonal polar research station located in the Petuniabukta (Petunia Bay), in the Northern part of Billefjord, and central part of Spitsbergen island in the Svalbard archipelago.

Staff and student numbers

At the start of the 2008/2009 academic year, the university had 46,817 undergraduates (including about 18,000 on weekend or evening courses), 1308 doctoral students, and 2247 other post-graduate students. The number of undergraduates declined slightly between 2005 and 2008.

At the end of 2008, the university had a total of 2892 teaching staff, including 257 full professors and 490 associate/assistant professors. It also had 2120 other employees.

Reputation 

The Adam Mickiewicz University is one of the top Polish universities. It was ranked by Perspektywy magazine as the third best Polish university. International rankings such as ARWU and QS University Rankings rank the university as the fourth best Polish higher level institution.

On the list of the best Emerging Europe and Central Asia universities compiled by QS University Rankings, the Adam Mickiewicz University was placed as 60th. In 2020, QS World University Ranking by Subject positioned the Adam Mickiewicz University as one of the best higher level institutions among the top 101–150 in Linguistics, 251–300 in English studies, 371 in Arts & Humanities and 551–600 in Physics & Astronomy, Chemistry and Biology.

Degrees 

Like most Polish universities, Adam Mickiewicz University awards the following degrees: 
 licencjat, normally a three-year course, sometimes considered equivalent to a Bachelor of Arts or Bachelor of Science degree 
 magister, normally a two-year course following the licencjat, considered equivalent to a Master of Arts or Master of Science degree
 doctorates
 habilitations

Schools and Faculties 

 School of Natural Sciences
 Faculty of Biology
 Faculty of Geographic and Geological Sciences
 School of Exact Sciences
 Faculty of Chemistry
 Faculty of Physics 
 Faculty of Mathematics and Computer Science
 School of Social Sciences
 Faculty of Human Geography and Planning
 Faculty of Political Science and Journalism 
 Faculty of Law and Administration
 Faculty of Psychology and Cognitive Science
 Faculty of Sociology
 Faculty of Educational Studies
 School of Humanities
 Faculty of Anthropology and Cultural Studies
 Faculty of Archeology
 Faculty of Philosophy
 Faculty of History 
 Faculty of Arts Studies
 Faculty of Theology
 School of Languages and Literatures
 Faculty of English
 Faculty of Polish and Classical Philology
 Faculty of Modern Languages and Literatures
 Doctoral School of Adam Mickiewicz University

People

Notable alumni and staff 

Adam Mickiewicz University's prestige and large class size have enabled it to graduate a large number of distinguished alumni.

Many AMU alumni are leaders and innovators in the business world, as well as prominents in society and the arts. Its graduates include authors (Kazimiera Iłłakowiczówna, Ryszard Krynicki, Stanisław Barańczak), journalists (Adam Michnik, Max Kolonko), entrepreneurs (Jan Kulczyk, Grażyna Kulczyk); composer Jan A. P. Kaczmarek, the recipient of the Academy Award for Best Original Score (2004); theatre practitioner Lech Raczak, film director Filip Bajon and literary critic and a music aficionado, Jerzy Waldorff. One of the most notable resistance fighters of the Home Army during Second World War, Jan Nowak-Jeziorański majored in economics in 1936, he worked as an assistant professor at the university.

Notable academic staff included:

 archeologists: Józef Kostrzewski;
 historians: Stanisław Kozierowski, Gerard Labuda, Henryk Łowmiański, Anna Wolff-Powęska;
 legal scholars: Zygmunt Ziembiński, Czesław Znamierowski, Antoni Peretiatkowicz, Michał Sczaniecki, Sławomira Wronkowska-Jaśkiewicz, Witalis Ludwiczak;
 philosophers: Kazimierz Ajdukiewicz, Władysław Tatarkiewicz, Leszek Nowak;
 linguists: Wiktor Jassem, Grażyna Vetulani;
 literature scholars: Zygmunt Szweykowski, Edward Balcerzan, Stanisław Barańczak;
 sociologists: Florian Znaniecki.

Hanna Suchocka, 5th Prime Minister of Poland, first woman to hold this post in Poland and the 14th woman to be appointed and serve as prime minister in the world, graduated from university. Additionally, Kazimierz Marcinkiewicz, the 12th Prime Minister of Poland and Roman Giertych, the Deputy Prime Minister of Poland and Minister of National Education between 2006 and 2007, are graduates.

Bohdan Winiarski was one of the longest-serving Judges of the International Court of Justice (1946–1967) and between 1961 and 1964 its president. Additionally, Krzysztof Skubiszewski, Minister of Foreign Affairs (1989–1993), was the Judge sitting ad hoc on the Court (1993–2004), also Paweł Wiliński, Professor of Jurisprudence, chair in Criminal Procedure, served as the Judge sitting ad hoc on the European Court of Human Rights for two terms (2010–2012, 2015–2016).

Three of the school's graduates, including Prof. Alfons Klafkowski (1985–1989), Prof. Mieczysław Tyczka (1989–1993) and Julia Przyłębska (since 2016), have served as the Presidents of the Constitutional Tribunal of the Republic of Poland. Three of the current fifteen members of the court graduated from AMU: Julia Przyłębska, Dr. Andrzej Zielonacki and Prof. Justyn Piskorski. Additionally, the President of Poland, Andrzej Duda, refused to swear in Prof. Roman Hauser, former President of the Supreme Administrative Court of Poland and Prof. Krzysztof Ślebzak as the Tribunal's judges.

Among the university's notable graduates are also:
Bogumił Brzezinski (b. 1943), chemist
Krzysztof Czyżewski (b. 1958), author
Franciszek Gągor (1951–2010), general, Chief of the General Staff of the Polish Armed Forces
Krzysztof Grabowski (b. 1965), poet and singer
Maciej Henneberg (b. 1949), Polish-Australian anatomist and communist-era dissident
Anna Jantar (1950–1980), singer
Tomasz Jasiński (b. 1951), historian
Włodzimierz Kołos (1928–1996), chemist and physicist, one of the founders of modern quantum chemistry 
Dominika Kulczyk (b. 1977), sinologist, businesswoman and philanthropist
Tomasz Łuczak (b. 1963), mathematician
Crocheted Olek (b. 1978), New York-based Polish-American artist
Halszka Osmólska (1930–2008), paleontologist
Karolina Pawliczak (b. 1976), lawyer and politician
Jan Sokołowski (1899–1982), zoologist 
Adam Szłapka (b. 1984), politician
Jan Węglarz (b. 1947), computer scientist

The Enigma Codebreakers 

In the 1920s the German military began using a 3-rotor Enigma, whose security was increased in 1930 by the addition of a plugboard. The Polish Cipher Bureau sought to break it due to the threat that Poland faced from Germany, but its early attempts did not succeed. Near the beginning of 1929, the Polish Cipher Bureau realized that mathematicians may make good codebreakers; the bureau invited math students at University of Poznań to take a class on cryptology.

After the class, the Bureau recruited some students to work part-time at a Bureau branch set up in Poznań for the students. The branch operated for some time. On 1 September 1932, 27-year-old Polish mathematician Marian Rejewski and two fellow Poznań University mathematics graduates, Henryk Zygalski and Jerzy Różycki, joined the Bureau full-time and moved to Warsaw. Their first task was to reconstruct a four-letter German naval cipher.

Honorary doctors 
Recipients of honorary doctorates from the university include Marshal Józef Piłsudski, Marshal Ferdinand Foch, Marie Curie, Ignacy Paderewski, Roman Dmowski, Witold Hensel, Ernst Håkon Jahr, Al Gore, John Maxwell Coetzee, Krzysztof Matyjaszewski, and media mogul Robert Maxwell.

Wisława Szymborska, recipient of the 1996 Nobel Prize in Literature, received a degree of Honorary Doctor of Letters of Adam Mickiewicz University in 1995, and it's the only honorary doctorate she has ever accepted.

List of rectors
 1919–1923: Heliodor Święcicki (1854–1923), doctor and philanthropist
 1923–1924: Zygmunt Lisowski (1880–1955), lawyer
 1924–1925: Stanisław Dobrzycki (1875–1931), Slavic language specialist
 1925–1926: Ludwik Sitowski (1880–1947), zoologist
 1926–1928: Jan Gabriel Grochmalicki (1883–1936), zoologist
 1928–1929: Edward Lubicz-Niezabitowski (1875–1946), doctor and zoologist
 1929–1931: Stanisław Kasznica (1874–1958), lawyer
 1931–1932: Jan Sajdak (1882–1967), classical philologist
 1932–1933: Stanisław Pawłowski (1882–1940), geographer
 1933–1936: Stanisław Runge (1888–1953), veterinarian
 1936–1939: Antoni Peretiatkowicz (1884–1956), lawyer
 1939: Bronisław Niklewski (1879–1961),  plant physiologist
 1945–1946: Stefan Tytus Dąbrowski (1877–1947), doctor and physiologist
 1946–1948: Stefan Błachowski (1889–1962), psychologist
 1948–1952: Kazimierz Ajdukiewicz (1890–1963), philosopher and logician
 1952–1956: Jerzy Suszko (1889–1972), chemist
 1956–1962: Alfons Klafkowski (1912–1992), lawyer
 1962–1965: Gerard Labuda (1916–2010), historian
 1965–1972: Czesław Łuczak (1922–2002), historian
 1972–1981: Benon Miśkiewicz (1930–2008), historian
 1981–1982: Janusz Ziółkowski (1924–2000), economist and sociologist
 1982–1984: Zbigniew Radwański (1924–2012), lawyer
 1984–1985: Franciszek Kaczmarek (1928–2015), physicist and mathematician
 1985–1988: Jacek Fisiak (1936–2019), English philologist
 1988–1990: Bogdan Marciniec (born 1941), chemist
 1990–1996: Jerzy Fedorowski (born 1934), geologist
 1996–2002: Stefan Jurga (1946–2022), physicist
 2002–2008: Stanisław Lorenc (1943–2020), geologist
 2008–2016: Bronisław Marciniak (born 1950), chemist
 2016–2020: Andrzej Lesicki (born 1950), biologist
 2020– : Bogumiła Kaniewska (born 1964), Polish philologist

Gallery

International cooperation
Christian-Albrechts-Universität zu Kiel, Germany 
Otto-Friedrich-Universität Bamberg, Germany 
University of Greifswald, Germany
Universität Wien, Austria 
Masaryk University, Brno, Czech Republic 
Université Libre de Bruxelles, Belgium 
University of Rennes 2 – Upper Brittany, France 
Universidad Complutense de Madrid, Spain 
Indiana University of Pennsylvania, Pennsylvania, US 
Cornell University Ithaca, New York, US 
Università degli Studi di Udine, Italy
Università degli Studi di Urbino, Italy
Sabancı University, Istanbul, Turkey
Universidade de Aveiro, Portugal
University of Agder, Norway
Doğuş University, Istanbul, Turkey
Anadolu University, Eskişehir, Turkey
Balıkesir University, Balıkesir, Turkey
Çukurova University, Adana, Turkey

See also 
 Open access in Poland
 List of modern universities in Europe (1801–1945)

References

External links 

  
  

 
Educational institutions established in 1919
Universities and colleges in Poznań
1919 establishments in Poland